John Joseph Roche (November 22, 1890 – March 30, 1983) was a Major League Baseball catcher who played for the St. Louis Cardinals in , , and .

External links

Major League Baseball catchers
St. Louis Cardinals players
Minor league baseball managers
Centralia Pets players
Calgary Bronchos players
Portland Beavers players
Oakland Oaks (baseball) players
Seattle Rainiers players
Oklahoma City Indians players
Denver Bears players
Tulsa Oilers (baseball) players
Baseball players from Los Angeles
1890 births
1983 deaths
American expatriate baseball players in Canada
Enid Harvesters players
Pocatello Bannocks players